Frank John "Dutch" Henry (May 12, 1902 – August 23, 1968) was an American Major League Baseball pitcher with the St. Louis Browns, Brooklyn Robins, New York Giants and Chicago White Sox between 1921 and 1930. Henry batted and threw left handed. He was born in Cleveland.

External links

1902 births
1968 deaths
Baseball players from Cleveland
Major League Baseball pitchers
Brooklyn Robins players
St. Louis Browns players
New York Giants (NL) players
Chicago White Sox players
Orlando Caps players
Orlando Tigers players
Mobile Bears players
New Orleans Pelicans (baseball) players
Indianapolis Indians players
Minneapolis Millers (baseball) players
Rochester Red Wings players
Williamsport Grays players
Montreal Royals players